Madslien is a surname. Notable people with the surname include:

Jorn Madslien (born 1967), British journalist
Valborg Madslien (born 1973), Norwegian ski-orienteer

Surnames of Norwegian origin